Lake Celilo is a  long reservoir on the Columbia River in the United States, between the U.S. states of Washington and Oregon. It was created in 1957 with the construction of The Dalles Dam near The Dalles, Oregon, and stretches upstream to the John Day Dam. Its filling drowned the former site of Celilo Falls and the neighboring fishing and trade village sites. Celilo Village, a small, unincorporated community of Native Americans, still exists today, though it is no longer the thriving cultural and economic center it once was.

The reservoir lies in parts of Wasco and Sherman counties in Oregon, and Klickitat County in Washington.

See also
 List of lakes in Oregon
 List of hydroelectric dams on the Columbia River

References 

Columbia River Gorge
Reservoirs in Washington (state)
Reservoirs in Oregon
Bodies of water of Klickitat County, Washington
Lakes of Sherman County, Oregon
Lakes of Wasco County, Oregon
Protected areas of Wasco County, Oregon
Protected areas of Klickitat County, Washington
Protected areas of Sherman County, Oregon
1957 establishments in Oregon
1957 establishments in Washington (state)